Oliver Friggieri (27 March 194721 November 2020) was a Maltese poet, novelist, literary critic, and philosopher.  He led the establishment of literary history and criticism in Maltese while teaching at the University of Malta, studying the works of Dun Karm, Rużar Briffa, and others.  A prolific writer himself, Friggieri explored new genres to advocate the Maltese language, writing the libretti for the first oratorio and the first cantata in Maltese.  His work aimed to promote the Maltese cultural identity, while not shying from criticism: one of his most famous novels, Fil-Parlament Ma Jikbrux Fjuri (No Flowers Grow in Parliament, 1986), attacked the tribalistic divisions of society caused by politics.   From philosophy, he was mostly interested in epistemology and existentialism.

Early life and education
Friggieri was born in Floriana in 1947.  He completed his secondary education at the Archbishop's Minor Seminary, and was in the Major Seminary until 1967.

He entered the University of Malta in 1964, earning a Bachelor of Arts in Maltese, Italian and Philosophy (1968).  He was the first recipient of a Masters degree in Maltese literature from the University of Malta (1975). In 1978, he received a Doctorate in Maltese literature and Literary Criticism from the Catholic University of Milan, Italy.

Career 
After graduating in 1968, Friggeri taught Maltese and Philosophy in secondary schools.  In 1976, he moved to the University of Malta; he was promoted from Assistant Lecturer to Lecturer in 1978, and from Lecturer to Associate Professor in 1988.  That same year, he was chosen to be the Chair of the Department of Maltese language, a position which he held until 2002. He was made a Professor in 1990.

Friggieri was an advocate of Maltese language and literature in newly independent Malta.  He co-founded Malta's Literary Revival Movement (Moviment Qawmien Letterarju) in 1967; he was part of the editorial board (1969–73) of Il-Polz, the movement's periodical, later becoming the editor (1974-1975). He also co-founded the popular children's literary and cultural magazine Is-Sagħtar (1971).  In 1971, Friggieri and Paul Mizzi established a publishing house, Klabb Kotba Maltin (Maltese Book Club), which facilitated the publishing of books in Maltese. He became the editor of the Journal of Maltese Studies in 1980.  He was also a member of the Association Internationale des Critiques Litteraires of Paris, France.

Friggieri published in various genres.  As his primary focus was Maltese literature, most of his publications were not of a directly philosophical nature; they included dictionaries of literature, oratorios, cantatas, literary criticism, literary biographies, and anthologies of his own poetry.  He wrote the libretti for the first Maltese-language oratorio (Pawlu ta’ Malta, 1989), and cantata (L-Għanja ta’ Malta, 1989);  both works were scored by Charles Camilleri.  Friggieri also wrote literary analyses of the works of Mikiel Anton Vassalli and Peter Caxaro.  His works have been translated into 16 languages, including English, French, German, Italian and Greek.

Friggieri supported the Maltese-language press, publishing articles in L-Orizzont and In-Nazzjon. Besides contributing to these and other local periodicals, Friggieri wrote novels and short stories.  Many of these works are of special interest to philosophy, featuring pathos and philosophical reflections. His fiction and poetry were influenced by existentialism.  His 1986 novel Fil-Parlament Ma Jikbrux Fjuri was highly controversial when published due to its unvarnished portrayal of political tribalism in Malta. He also penned a tribute to Karin Grech and Raymond Caruana, casualties of Maltese political violence in the 1980s.

Friggieri was part of the committee that translated EU legal texts into Maltese.  In 2008, Friggieri published an autobiography, Fjuri li ma Jinxfux (Flowers Which Never Wither), spanning the years 1955–1990.  In addition to his own writings, he translated works from English, Italian, and Latin into Maltese.

Friggieri received the Ġieħ l-Akkademja tal-Malti gold medal in 2016 and won Malta's National Book Prize several times. Prime Minister Joseph Muscat appointed him as Chair of the Foundation for National Festivities in 2013.

In popular culture 

Verses from Friggieri's poem "Jekk" ("If") can be found printed on some bus shelters around Malta. This led to the poem being known as "the bus stop poem" by the general public.

In 2018, the Maltese band The Travellers released the song "Ilkoll Flimkien". The lyrics of this song contain excerpts of the poem "Jekk".

Personal life 

Friggieri and his wife Eileen had one daughter and two grandchildren.  He died on 21 November 2020. A funeral organised by the state was held for him on 25 November, which was declared a national day of mourning.

In December 2020, PN Floriana Minority Leader James Aaron Ellul announced that part of Triq l-Argotti will be named after the late Maltese poet, writer and lecturer Oliver Friggieri. The proposal was put forward by Ellul within the Local Council, in November 2020.    

A monument in his honour will be erected in his hometown of Floriana. The design of the monument is by the Maltese artist John Grima.

Honours 

 : Government Literary Award (1988, 1996, 1997)
 : Member, National Order of Merit (1999)
 :  Prize (2002)
: Officer of the Order of Merit of the Italian Republic (2012)
: Ġieħ l-Akkademja tal-Malti Gold Medal (2016)

Partial bibliography
Poetry
 1967 – Dħaħen fl-imħuħ 
2002 – Sotto l'ombra degli occhi (anthology)
Short stories
 1979 – Stejjer Għal Qabel Jidlam (Stories Before Nightfall)
 1991 – Fil-Gżira Taparsi Jikbru l-Fjuri (On The Island Where Flowers Pretend To Grow)

Novels
 1977 – Il-Gidba (The Lie)
 1980 – L-Istramb (The Odd Fellow)
 1986 – Fil-Parlament ma Jikbrux Fjuri (No Flowers Grow in Parliament)
 1998 – Ġiżimin li Qatt ma Jiftaħ (The Jasmine Which Never Blossoms)
 2000 – It-Tfal Jiġu bil-Vapuri (Children Come in Ships)
 2006 – La Jibbnazza Niġi Lura (I Will Return After the Tempest)
 2008 – Fjuri li ma Jinxfux (Flowers Which Never Wither)
 2010 – Dik id-Dgħajsa f’Nofs il-Port (That Boat in Mid-Harbour)
 2013 – Children Come by Ship (English translation of the 2000 novel)
 2015 – Let Fair Weather Bring Me Home
Dictionary
 Dizzjunarju ta' Termini Letterarji (Dictionary of Literary Terms), 1986 and 1996

Nonfiction and criticism
 Kittieba ta' Żmienna, 1970
 Ir-Ruħ fil-Kelma, 1973
Rużar Briffa – L-Aħħar Poeżiji u Taħdita Letterarja, 1973
 Introduction to Ġ. A. Vassallo's Il-Ġifen Tork, 1975
Fl-Għarbiel, 1976
 Il-Kultura Taljana f'Dun Karm, 1976
 Mekkaniżmi Metaforiċi f'Dun Karm, 1978
Saġġi Kritiċi, 1979
 Storja tal-Letteratura Maltija, I, 1979
 Dun Karm – il-Bniedem fil-Poeta, 1980
Dun Karm – Il-Poeżiji Miġbura, 1980
L'esperienza leopardiana di un poeta maltese: Karmenu Vassallo, 1983
 Rużar Briffa – Il-Poeżiji Miġbura, 1983
 Ġwann Mamo – Il-Kittieb tar-Riforma Soċjali, 1984
 Il-Ħajja ta' Rużar Briffa, 1984
 L-Idea tal-Letteratura, 1986
 Il-Jien u Lil hinn Minnu, 1988
 Dun Karm, 1989 
 Saggi sulla letteratura maltese, 1989 
 Il-Kuxjenza Nazzjonali Maltija, 1995
 L-Istudji Kritiċi Miġbura, 1995
 L-Istorja tal-Poeżija Maltija, 2001
 Dun Karm – Le poesie italiane, 2007

See also
Philosophy in Malta

References

External links

Profile on OAR@UM
Il-Kelma li Tqanqal ir-Ruh (The Word That Stirs the Soul)Radio program (in Maltese) where Friggieri discussed his work

20th-century Maltese philosophers
Maltese educational theorists
Maltese educators
1947 births
2020 deaths
People from Floriana
Maltese male novelists
20th-century Maltese poets
Università Cattolica del Sacro Cuore alumni
University of Malta alumni
Academic staff of the University of Malta
Recipients of the National Order of Merit (Malta)
Officers of the Order of Merit of the Italian Republic
21st-century Maltese poets
Maltese male poets
20th-century Maltese novelists
21st-century Maltese novelists
English–Maltese translators
Italian–Maltese translators
Latin–Maltese translators